David Craig Reavis (born June 19, 1950) is a former National Football League (NFL) offensive lineman from 1974 through 1983. He earned two Super Bowl rings with the Pittsburgh Steelers.

In 1983 Reavis helped evacuate United Airlines Flight 200 at O'Hare International Airport. After an engine exploded during takeoff, he "ripped open the exit door, stowed it to one side", and led other passengers out of the Boeing 727, a fellow passenger said.

References

1950 births
Living people
Players of American football from Nashville, Tennessee
American football offensive linemen
Arkansas Razorbacks football players
Pittsburgh Steelers players
Tampa Bay Buccaneers players